Loudonville  may refer to:

Loudonville, New York
Loudonville, Ohio